The AWM Service Award is an annual award given by the Association for Women in Mathematics.  The AWM depends largely on the work of volunteers.  In order to recognize individuals for helping to promote and support women in mathematics through exceptional volunteer service to the association the AWM Executive Committee established the AWM Service Award in 2012.  The recipients of the award are recognized at the annual AWM Reception and Awards Presentation at the Joint Mathematics Meetings and in the Notices of the American Mathematical Society.

List of Award Winners 

  Recipient of the AWM Lifetime Service Award

See also

 List of mathematics awards

References

External links 

 
 
 

2012 establishments
Awards and prizes of the Association for Women in Mathematics